Eckhard Wallossek (born 25 September 1944) is a German field hockey player. He competed in the men's tournament at the 1968 Summer Olympics.

References

External links
 

1944 births
Living people
German male field hockey players
Olympic field hockey players of East Germany
Field hockey players at the 1968 Summer Olympics
People from Niemcza
20th-century German people